Belville is a town in Brunswick County, North Carolina, United States. The population was 1,936 at the 2010 census, up from 285 in 2000. It is part of the Wilmington, NC metropolitan area.

History
Belville was incorporated as a town in 1977.

Geography
Belville is located in northeastern Brunswick County at  (34.219187, -77.995396). It is directly across the Brunswick River and Cape Fear River from downtown Wilmington. U.S. Routes 17, 74 and 76, traveling concurrently as the Andrew Jackson Highway/Ocean Highway, form the northern edge of the town and cross the rivers from there into Wilmington.

Demographics

2020 census

As of the 2020 United States census, there were 2,406 people, 954 households, and 651 families residing in the town.

2000 census
As of the census of 2000, there were 285 people, 108 households, and 84 families residing in the town. The population density was 70.6 people per square mile (27.2/km2). There were 142 housing units at an average density of 35.2 per square mile (13.6/km2). The racial makeup of the town was 81.75% White, 14.39% African American, 1.75% Pacific Islander, and 2.11% from two or more races. Hispanic or Latino of any race were 2.81% of the population.

There were 108 households, out of which 42.6% had children under the age of 18 living with them, 62.0% were married couples living together, 11.1% had a female householder with no husband present, and 22.2% were non-families. 17.6% of all households were made up of individuals, and 4.6% had someone living alone who was 65 years of age or older. The average household size was 2.64 and the average family size was 2.95.

In the town, the population was spread out, with 28.4% under the age of 18, 11.9% from 18 to 24, 40.7% from 25 to 44, 13.7% from 45 to 64, and 5.3% who were 65 years of age or older. The median age was 27 years. For every 100 females, there were 95.2 males. For every 100 females age 18 and over, there were 100.0 males.

The median income for a household in the town was $55,536, and the median income for a family was $56,250. Males had a median income of $29,167 versus $23,929 for females. The per capita income for the town was $22,482. About 7.4% of families and 14.5% of the population were below the poverty line, including 28.1% of those under the age of eighteen and 7.4% of those 65 or over.

References

External links
 Town of Belville official website
 Belville, North Carolina's Lifestyle Magazine

Towns in North Carolina
Towns in Brunswick County, North Carolina
Cape Fear (region)